Donavon Lee Larson (1947 – December 4, 2004) was an American football player and coach. He served as the head football coach at his alma mater, Hamline University, from 2001 to 2004.

References

External links
 

1947 births
2004 deaths
Hamline Pipers football coaches
Hamline Pipers football players
North Dakota State Bison football coaches
High school football coaches in Minnesota